John Archibald Ralph Oliver (25 November 1918 – 24 February 1992) was an English cricketer.  Oliver was a right-handed batsman who bowled both right-arm off break and right-arm medium-fast.  He was born in Whitwell, Hertfordshire.

Oliver made his debut for Bedfordshire in the 1936 Minor Counties Championship against Buckinghamshire.  He played Minor counties cricket for Bedfordshire from 1936 to 1961, making 119 appearances for the county.  He made a single first-class appearance for the Minor Counties against Kent in 1951.  In this match, he ended the Minor Counties first-innings unbeaten on 84.  In their second-innings, he was dismissed by Ted Witherden for 9 runs, with the match ending in victory for Kent by an innings and 10 runs.

He died on 24 February 1992 at Luton, Bedfordshire.

References

External links

1918 births
1992 deaths
People from North Hertfordshire District
English cricketers
Bedfordshire cricketers
Minor Counties cricketers